The 2001 Copa de la Reina de Fútbol was the 19th edition of the main Spanish women's football cup. It was played between 13 May and 24 June 2001 and Levante won its second title.

Bracket

References

External links
Results at Arquero-Arba

Copa de la Reina
Women
2008